Jonava Sports Arena is an indoor arena in Jonava, Lithuania. Mostly used for basketball and volleyball games.

History 
Although construction works started in 2010 arena was not opened until early 2017 due lack of funding. In 2015 fire started and spread across the roof of unfinished arena which resulted in more delays.

References

External links
Official website of Arena

Indoor arenas in Lithuania
Sports venues in Jonava
Basketball venues in Lithuania